Dichomeris phaeothina is a moth in the family Gelechiidae. It was described by Jean Ghesquière in 1940. It is found in the former Équateur province of the Democratic Republic of the Congo.

References

Moths described in 1940
phaeothina
Endemic fauna of the Democratic Republic of the Congo